Kyle Graham Davies (born April 11, 1989 in Danville, California, United States) is an American former soccer player.

Career

Professional
Davies was a member of the US National U-17 Residency in Bradenton, FL and was expected to go play in college before entering the MLS SuperDraft. However, he was offered a contract with English side Southampton, who he joined in February 2007. Work permit issues were not a problem due to having British parents. He was a consistent member of the youth and reserve setup at Southampton but never made a first-team appearance.

Nearing the end of his contract with Southampton, he was approached by MLS who signed him to a four-year deal before entering him into a weighted lottery that would allocate him to a single participating MLS club. Real Salt Lake were the winners of the lottery and immediately signed him to their roster.  On April 28, Davies was traded to FC Dallas for a second-round draft pick in the 2010 MLS SuperDraft so RSL could have the room to re-sign Fabián Espíndola. He made his debut for Dallas on June 13, 2009, in a game against Houston Dynamo.

Davies was waived by Dallas on May 5, 2011 and was picked up by Los Angeles Galaxy on May 11, 2011.

Davies was traded to Toronto FC on September 15, 2011, for Dasan Robinson. Davies made his debut as a second half sub for Doneil Henry on October 15 against Philadelphia Union, the game ended in a 1–1 away draw. Davies was waived by Toronto on November 23, 2011.

Davies was signed by Orlando City on April 5, 2012, shoring up the defense for the defending USL Pro champions.

International
Davies was a captain for the United States Under-20 team during the 2009 CONCACAF Under-20 Championship, starting all five games for the United States in the tournament.  The team qualified for the 2009 FIFA Under-20 World Cup taking place in Egypt, where Davies captained the team in the first and last games.  He saw limited playing time, however, due to a head injury.

Career statistics

Last updated on September 21, 2011

References

External links
 

1989 births
Living people
American soccer players
People from Danville, California
Soccer players from California
Association football defenders
Southampton F.C. players
Real Salt Lake players
FC Dallas players
LA Galaxy players
Toronto FC players
Orlando City SC (2010–2014) players
Expatriate soccer players in Canada
Major League Soccer players
United States men's youth international soccer players
United States men's under-20 international soccer players
United States men's under-23 international soccer players
USL Championship players
2009 CONCACAF U-20 Championship players